Jiří Holubec (born 3 March 1966) is a Czech biathlete. He competed at the 1988, 1992, 1994 and the 1998 Winter Olympics. After retiring from competition he became a coach, serving as an assistant coach to the Czech women's biathlon team.

References

External links
 

1966 births
Living people
Czech male biathletes
Olympic biathletes of Czechoslovakia
Olympic biathletes of the Czech Republic
Biathletes at the 1988 Winter Olympics
Biathletes at the 1992 Winter Olympics
Biathletes at the 1994 Winter Olympics
Biathletes at the 1998 Winter Olympics
People from Jilemnice
Czech sports coaches
Cross-country skiing coaches
Sportspeople from the Liberec Region